Saeed bin Nasir (born 19 December 1979 in Karachi, Sindh) is a Pakistani first-class cricketer who plays for Karachi and Pakistan A.

A right-handed middle order batsman, he was included in the squad for a Test series against Bangladesh in 2003–04 but did not play a Test.

References
 
Player Stats: Saeed bin Nasir PlayCricket

1979 births
Living people
Karachi cricketers
Pakistani cricketers
Cricketers from Karachi
Karachi Whites cricketers
Karachi Urban cricketers
Karachi Blues cricketers
Khan Research Laboratories cricketers
Baluchistan cricketers
Karachi Zebras cricketers
Sindh cricketers
Baluchistan Bears cricketers
Karachi Dolphins cricketers
Sui Southern Gas Company cricketers
Sri Lanka Ports Authority Cricket Club cricketers